Prometheus Bringing Fire to Earth is an outdoor sculpture by Icelandic artist Nína Sæmundsson, installed in Los Angeles' MacArthur Park, in the U.S. state of California.

References 

Outdoor sculptures in Greater Los Angeles
Prometheus
Sculptures of mythology
Statues in Los Angeles
Westlake, Los Angeles